Alazocine (developmental code name -10047), also known more commonly as N-allylnormetazocine (NANM), is a synthetic opioid analgesic of the benzomorphan family related to metazocine, which was never marketed. In addition to its opioid activity, the drug is a sigma receptor agonist, and has been used widely in scientific research in studies of this receptor. Alazocine is described as a potent analgesic, psychotomimetic or hallucinogen, and opioid antagonist. Moreover, one of its enantiomers was the first compound that was found to selectively label the σ1 receptor, and led to the discovery and characterization of the receptor.

Pharmacology

Pharmacodynamics
Alazocine shows stereoselectivity in its pharmacodynamics. The (–)-enantiomer is a non-selective and high-affinity ligand of the μ-, κ-, and δ-opioid receptors (Ki = 3.0, 4.7, and 15 nM in guinea pig brain membranes) with very low affinity for the sigma σ1 receptor (Ki = 1,800–4,657 nM in guinea pig brain membranes). It acts as a moderate-efficacy partial agonist of the κ-opioid receptor (Ki = 0.4 nM, EC50 = 24 nM, and Emax = 66% for (±)-alazocine against the mouse receptor transfected in HEK293 cells) and as an antagonist of the μ-opioid receptor (Ki = 1.15 nM for (±)-alazocine against the mouse receptor transfected in HEK293 cells). It is also an agonist of the δ-opioid receptor with far lower potency (Ki = not reported, IC50 = 184 nM, and  = 68% for (±)-alazocine against the mouse receptor transfected in HEK293 cells).

Conversely, the (+)-stereoisomer has little affinity for the opioid receptors (Ki for 1,900 nM, 1,600 nM, and 19,000 nM for the μ-, κ-, δ-opioid receptors in guinea pig brain membranes) and instead is a selective and high-affinity agonist of the σ1 receptor (Ki = 48–66 nM in guinea pig brain membranes). However, the (+)-enantiomer also shows moderate affinity for the dizocilpine (MK-801) or phencyclidine (PCP) site of the NMDA receptor (Ki = 587 nM in rat brain membranes relative to 45 nM for the σ1 receptor) and, hence, is an uncompetitive NMDA receptor antagonist as well at higher concentrations. As such, (+)-alazocine is only modestly selective as a ligand of the σ1 receptor.

Both enantiomers of alazocine have very low affinity for the sigma σ2 receptor (Ki = 13,694 nM and 4,581 nM for the (+)- and (–)-enantiomers, respectively, in rat brain membranes or rat PC12 cells). As such, due to its high affinity for the σ1 receptor, (+)-alazocine can be used to distinguish between the two sigma receptor subtypes in scientific research, for instance in radioligand binding assays.

Taken together, (–)-alazocine is a selective partial agonist of the κ-opioid receptor, antagonist of the μ-opioid receptor, and to a far lesser extent agonist of the δ-opioid receptor with very low affinity for the sigma receptors, while (+)-alazocine is a selective agonist of the sigma σ1 receptor and to a lesser (~10-fold) extent antagonist of the NMDA receptor with low affinity for the opioid and sigma σ2 receptors.

History
Alazocine was one of the early members of the benzomorphan family of opioid analgesics to be investigated. It was first described in the scientific literature in 1961. Its development resulted from nalorphine (N-allylnormorphine), a potent analgesic and opioid antagonist with similar pharmacology which had been introduced in the mid-1950s. Alazocine was found to produce strong psychotomimetic effects in humans, and it was not further developed for clinical use. Subsequently, other benzomorphans, such as pentazocine (an N-dimethylallylbenzomorphan), cyclazocine (an N-cyclopropylmethylbenzomorphan), and phenazocine (an N-phenylethylbenzomorphan), were developed, and some have been marketed for use as analgesics.

The sigma σ1 receptor was named in 1976 and (+)-alazocine was described as its prototypical ligand. The receptor was initially thought to be an opioid receptor, and then was confused with the NMDA receptor for a time, but was ultimately distinguished from them both. The psychotomimetic effects of alazocine and the other benzomorphans were initially attributed incorrectly to agonism of the σ1 receptor; subsequent research established that the effects are in fact caused by agonism of the κ-opioid receptor and/or antagonism of the NMDA receptor. The sigma σ2 receptor was discovered and named in 1990, and was identified in part due to the dramatically reduced affinity of alazocine for the receptor relative to the σ1 receptor (in contrast to non-selective ligands like haloperidol, ditolylguanidine, and (+)-3-PPP, which show similar affinity for both subtypes).

References 

Allylamines
Analgesics
Benzomorphans
Delta-opioid receptor agonists
Dissociative drugs
Kappa-opioid receptor agonists
Mu-opioid receptor antagonists
NMDA receptor antagonists
Phenols
Sigma agonists